Catherine O'Neill (née Wayland, born 4 December 1975) is a former Paralympian athlete from Ireland who competed mainly in category F51 track and field events.

Athletics career
O'Neil took up disability sport whilst at a sports camp in New York City at the age of twelve. She first represented Ireland at a major international tournament at Birmingham during the 1998 IPC Athletics World Championships, winning gold in the F51 women's discus throw. O'Neil competed at three Summer Paralympic Games during her career, starting at the 2000 Summer Paralympics at Sydney. Initially specializing in the discus, show progressed in her later career to also entering club throw events. Although not competing in Athens, O'Neill was in the Ireland team for both the 2008 Games in Beijing and 2012 Games in London. Her only Paralympic podium finish came at London, where she won a silver in the discus throw - F51/52/53.

O'Neill's most successful tournament was the 2011 IPC Athletics World Championships in Christchurch, winning a gold in the discus throw and a silver in the club throw. After the 2014 IPC Athletics European Championships at Swansea, O'Neill decided to retire from sport.

Notes

Paralympic athletes of Ireland
Athletes (track and field) at the 2000 Summer Paralympics
Athletes (track and field) at the 2008 Summer Paralympics
Athletes (track and field) at the 2012 Summer Paralympics
Paralympic silver medalists for Ireland
Living people
1975 births
Medalists at the 2012 Summer Paralympics
People from New Ross
Irish female club throwers
Irish female discus throwers
Paralympic medalists in athletics (track and field)